Francis Joash Ayume (1940–2004), was a Ugandan politician and lawyer. At the time of his death he was the incumbent Attorney General of Uganda.

Early life and education
He was born on 18 August 1940, in Koboko District to Misaeli Onale, an elementary school teacher. Ayume attended Nyangilia Primary School in Koboko for his primary schooling. He attended Busoga College Mwiri for his O-Level and A-Level studies, graduating in 1964.

He was admitted to the University of Dar es Salaam, where he studied law, graduating in 1967. Later he was awarded a Diploma in Legal Practice from the Law Development Centre in Kampala, Uganda's capital city.

Career
During the 1990s, Ayume entered Ugandan elective politics and was elected to Uganda's parliament to represent Koboko District. From 1998 until 2001, he served as Speaker of the House during Uganda's Sixth Parliament (1996–2001). "In 2001, he was appointed Attorney General and represented Uganda in the International Court of Justice in a case where Uganda was accused of invading DR Congo and allegedly plundering its natural resources". On Sunday 16 May 2004, he was involved in a fatal automobile accident at Nakasongola on the Kampala-Gulu Highway.

Works
Francis Ayume authored a book "Criminal Procedure And Law in Uganda". The book is incorporated in the curriculum at Makerere University School of Law.

References

External links
Website of the Parliament of Uganda

1940 births
2004 deaths
People from Koboko District
Members of the Parliament of Uganda
Koboko District
20th-century Ugandan lawyers
University of Dar es Salaam alumni
People educated at Busoga College
National Resistance Movement politicians
Speakers of the Parliament of Uganda
Law Development Centre alumni
People from Northern Region, Uganda
Attorneys General of Uganda